The 1931 Brownlow Medal was the eighth year the award was presented to the player adjudged the fairest and best player during the Victorian Football League (VFL) home and away season. Haydn Bunton of the Fitzroy Football Club won the medal by polling twenty-six votes during the 1931 VFL season.

Following the previous season's three-way tie, and the confusion which followed, the conditions governing the medal were amended. From this season, the umpire would award votes to the best three players on the ground – three votes to the best player, two to the second best, and one to the third best. The player with the most overall votes would win; in the event of a tie, the player with the most three-vote games would win, then the player with the most two-vote games. A new provision under which a player who had been suspended during the season became ineligible for the award was also added.

Leading votegetters

References 

1931 in Australian rules football
1931